Joe Beardshaw is a former England Under 21 international rugby union player. A lock, he played for Wasps and Glasgow Warriors and Cornish Pirates. Whilst at Wasps he helped them win the Anglo-Welsh Cup in 1999 in the final of which he was a replacement.

While with Glasgow Warriors, Beardshaw made a few appearances with amateur club GHA. He was released by Glasgow in an end-of-season clear-out in 2005. He stated: "Leaving Glasgow is a huge blow because I have thoroughly enjoyed my time with the squad. I felt I had been performing pretty consistently since the home Heineken Cup clash with Toulouse - but at the end of the day there was no deal for me."

He then signed for Cornish Pirates in 2005. He won the EDF trophy with the Pirates in April 2007. He was released at the end of 2008–09 season after suffering a knee injury.

He played for a Wasps Legends team in 2013.

References

External links
ESPN Profile

Rugby union locks
Living people
Glasgow Warriors players
Glasgow Hutchesons Aloysians RFC players
Cornish Pirates players
Bedford Blues players
Wasps RFC players
1976 births